John Francis Gargan (July 1, 1888 – August 18, 1960) was an American football player and coach.  He served as the head football coach at Georgetown University (1912–1913), Rensselaer Polytechnic Institute (1914), Fordham University (1916–1917, 1922–1926) and New York University (1920–1921), compiling career college football record of 55–40–8.  In 1917, Gargan was co-head coach with Frank McCaffrey for Fordham.

Head coaching record

See also
 List of college football head coaches with non-consecutive tenure

References

External links

Frank Gargan coaching record at Sports Reference

1888 births
1960 deaths
American football quarterbacks
Fordham Rams football coaches
Fordham Rams football players
Georgetown Hoyas football coaches
NYU Violets football coaches
RPI Engineers football coaches
Players of American football from New York City